Birodh Khatiwada is a Nepalese politician belonging to CPN (Unified Socialist). He was also a member of the House of Representatives from Makwanpur 2 constituency. 

Khatiwad is the Minister for Health and Population of Nepal.

Personal life 
He is the father of Miss Nepal 2018 Shrinkhala Khatiwada. His wife Munu Sigdel Khatiwada is also a member of CPN (Unified Socialist) and member of Provincial Assembly of Province No. 3.

Electoral history

2017 general elections

1999 legislative elections

1994 legislative elections

1991 legislative elections

See also
 CPN (Unified Socialist)

References

1959 births
Living people
People from Hetauda
Place of birth missing (living people)
Nepal MPs 2017–2022
Nepal MPs 1991–1994
Communist Party of Nepal (Unified Socialist) politicians
Nepal MPs 1994–1999
Nepal MPs 1999–2002
Government ministers of Nepal
Communist Party of Nepal (Unified Marxist–Leninist) politicians